Thomas Colcombet (born March 6, 1975) is a French theoretical computer scientist known for settling major open problems on tree walking automata jointly with Mikołaj Bojańczyk. Colcombet is currently a CNRS Research Director at Paris Diderot University.

Biography

Colcombet earned his undergraduate degree from École normale supérieure de Lyon (2000) and his doctorate from University of Rennes 1 (2004). Since 2004, he is a CNRS researcher, and a Research Director since 2016. He received the CNRS Bronze Medal in 2010.

Besides his work on tree walking automata, Colcombet contributed to ω-automata, particularly to state complexity of Büchi automata, and to various topics in logic in computer science.

References

External links
 
 
 

French computer scientists
1975 births
Living people